Golpogulo Amader is a Bangladeshi Bengali language television drama series that premiered on NTV on 8 December 2017 on and ended on 29 June 2018 completing 57 episodes. Two episodes were aired on each Thursday and Friday in a week. It is the first television series directed by Mizanur Rahman Aryan

Plot 
The plot of the drama serial is about stories of love and separation. An elderly couple Akbar and Ayesha running a restaurant. Most of the customers are couples in the restaurant. They always notice the relationship and live between each couple in the restaurant. They try to fix relationships which are broken.

Cast 

 Syed Hasan Imam as Akbar
 Dilara Zaman as Ayesha
 Ziaul Faruq Apurba
 Tasnuva Tisha
 Intekhab Dinar
 Nadia Mim
 Ananda Khalid
Toriqul Islam Tusher as Tusher
 Tausif
 Jovan
 Allen Shuvro
 Sabnam Faria
 Nadia Nodi
 Safa Kabir
 Iffat Tarash
 Sayra
 Rimi Karim
 Khalekuzzaman
 Mili Bashar
 Sheli Ahsan
 Maznun Mizan
 Tamim Mridha
 Soumik
 Abir Mirza
 Sudip
 Pranil
 RJ Sabbir

Music 

The title track of the series is written and sung by Minar Rahman and theme music is composed by Sajid Sarkar.

See also 
Porer Meye

References

External links 
 on NTV

2017 Bangladeshi television series debuts
2017 television seasons
2018 television seasons
Bangladeshi drama television series
Bengali-language television programming in Bangladesh
NTV (Bangladeshi TV channel) original programming